Würfel is a surname. Notable people with the surname include:

Gesche Würfel (born 1976), visual artist born in Germany
Günther Würfel (born 1948), Austrian sprinter
Wilhelm Würfel (1790–1832), Czech composer, pianist, and conductor

German-language surnames